Jeniffer Carolina Barrios Ruiz (born 10 June 1997) is a Guatemalan retired footballer who played as a midfielder. She has been a member of the Guatemala women's national team.

International career
Barrios represented Guatemala at the 2012 CONCACAF Women's U-17 Championship. At senior level, she capped during the 2014 CONCACAF Women's Championship.

See also
List of Guatemala women's international footballers

References

1997 births
Living people
Guatemalan women's footballers
Guatemala women's international footballers
Women's association football midfielders